Joella Productions was a television production company based in London that produced the children's television series Underground Ernie for the BBC. It was founded by John Deery and Sid Rainey and named after Deery's son, Joe, and Rainey's daughter, Ella.

Logo
The logo is simply the letters J-O-E-L-L-A in spaghetti.

External links 
 Joella Productions

Television production companies of the United Kingdom